Michael James Ryan Busbee (June 18, 1976 – September 29, 2019), known professionally as Busbee, was an American songwriter, record producer, publisher, record label executive, and multi-instrumentalist. He is known for his work in both pop music and country music. Artists with whom Busbee has worked with 5 Seconds of Summer, Keith Urban, and Maren Morris.

Early life
Michael James Ryan Busbee was born in Walnut Creek, California, and grew up in the San Francisco Bay Area. He began playing piano when he was seven years old, and started playing jazz trombone in high school. Busbee marched with the World Class Drum Corps, Blue Devils.

He studied jazz at William Paterson University in Wayne, New Jersey, after receiving a scholarship to the school in 1995, but returned to the San Francisco Bay Area before graduating.

Career 
He moved to Los Angeles in 2000 and started working at a music studio assisting rock producer Eric Valentine, and began learning to play more instruments, including guitar, bass, and drums. After working and assisting others in music studios for a while, he began working on his own as a songwriter, producer, mixer, writer, and engineer. He started working on many pop songs, with many artists who had been on reality singing competitions like American Idol and The X Factor.

After five years of working in Los Angeles, he starting working in Nashville, Tennessee as well, at the recommendation of another writer. Musician and record producer Dann Huff then signed him to a publishing deal. Since then, Busbee has written for and cowritten with a broad range of artists including Gwen Stefani, P!nk, Shakira, Maren Morris, Timbaland featuring Katy Perry, Keith Urban, Jon Bellion, Kelly Clarkson, Florida Georgia Line, and Lady Antebellum. Busbee was nominated for a Grammy Award for Best Country Song in 2017 for his work on Maren Morris' debut single, "My Church".

In December 2018, Busbee started his own music label, Altadena, in Los Angeles in partnership with Warner Bros. Records, Warner Chappell Music, and Red Light Management.

Personal life 
Busbee was diagnosed with a form of brain cancer called glioblastoma during 2019 and died later that year on September 28, in Los Angeles. He was survived by his wife and three children.

Discography

Songs written

Production and co-production

Other songs
Cris Cab – "The Truth", "The Sun Is Gonna Rise Again"
Eliza Doolittle – "I'm in Love With You”
Mickey Guyton – "Safe"
Girls Generation – "Chain Reaction"
Danny Gokey – "I Still Believe"
Francesca Michielin – "Il più bell'abbraccio"
Ryan Star – "Stay Awhile" Single'
Westlife – "Get Away”
Elliott Yamin -"In Love With You Forever", "The Bridge Is Burning"
Dima Bilan & Anastacia - "Safety"
Cale Dodds - "I Like Where This Is Going"

References

External links
The official website of Busbee
Interview, HitQuarters 4 Apr 2011
  as Mike Busbee
  as Michael James Ryan

1976 births
2019 deaths
21st-century American musicians
American country record producers
Musicians from the San Francisco Bay Area
People from Walnut Creek, California
Record producers from California
Songwriters from California
Deaths from brain cancer in the United States
Deaths from glioblastoma